Saptak (Urdu: سپتاک, literal English translation: "gamut") is the second studio album by the Pakistani rock band, Mekaal Hasan Band, released in October 2009. The album also contained the hit track "Chal Bulleya", and new versions of a couple of songs from the previous MHB album Sampooran.

Track listing
All music composed by Mekaal Hasan Band.

Personnel
All information is taken from the CD.

Mekaal Hasan Band
 Mekaal Hasan – lead guitar
 Javed Bashir – lead vocals
 Mohammad Ahsan Papu – flute

Additional musicians
Drums: John "Gumby" Louis Pinto
Drums & Percussion on "Albaella" by Pete Lockett
Drums & Percussion on "Andholan" & "Huns Dhun" by Javed Akhtar
Guitars and Bass: Amir Azhar

Production
Produced by Mekaal Hasan
Recorded & Mixed at Digital Fidelity Studio, Lahore, Punjab
Guitar sound engineer: Mekaal Hasan
Assisted by Adnan Peter Gill
Album artwork by Mehreen Murtaza

External links
 Official Website
 A detailed review of Saptak

2009 albums
Mekaal Hasan Band albums
Urdu-language albums